Acacia calamifolia, commonly known as wallowa or reed-leaf wattle, is a shrub or tree belonging to the genus Acacia and the subgenus Phyllodineae endemic to south eastern parts of Australia.

Description
The phyllodes have a curved point, are glabrous and sometimes scurfy with four non-prominent nerves. It blooms between October and November producing yellow flowers. The inflorescences are found on two to eight headed racemes. The spherical to obloid shaped flower-heads contain 28 to 46 golden pale yellow to golden flowers.

Taxonomy
The species was first formally described by the botanist Robert Sweet in John Lindley's work Edwards's Botanical Register in 1824. The species was reclassified as Racosperma calamifolium by Leslie Pedley in 2003 then transferred ack to the genus Acacia in 2006. Other synonyms include; Acacia microcarpa var. linearis, Acacia pulverulenta and Acacia uncinata.
The specific epithet is taken from the Latin words calamus meaning reed and folium meaning leaf in reference to the shape of the phyllodes.

Distribution
The shrub is found in South Australia from the Flinders Ranges in the north south to the Tothill Ranges in the northern Mount Lofty Ranges and east to Broken Hill and central parts of New South Wales. It is often a part of woodland and open scrubland communities where it grows in a variety of soil types different soils. It is also found in north western Victoria.

Cultivation
The shrub is planted as medium-sized ornamental wattle that is suitable as a low shelter plant. It can tolerate full sun or part shade and prefers a well-drained soil but can endure short periods of water logging. It makes good habitat for bird life and the seeds are and an important part of the Mallee fowl's diet.

See also
 List of Acacia species

References

calamifolia
Flora of South Australia
Flora of New South Wales
Flora of Queensland
Flora of Victoria (Australia)
Plants described in 1824
Taxa named by John Lindley